{{Infobox martial artist
| name            = Vernon White
| other_names     = Tiger
| image           = 
| image_size      = 200px
| alt             =
| caption         =
| birth_name      = Vernon Verdell White 
| birth_date      = 
| birth_place     = Sparks, Nevada, United States
| death_date      = 
| death_place     =
| death_cause     =
| residence       =
| nationality     = American
| height          = 
| weight          = 
| weight_class    = Light HeavyweightMiddleweight
| reach           = 
| style           =
| stance          = 
| fighting_out_of = Palo Alto, California, United States
| team            = Lion's Den
| rank            =  Black Belt in Taekwondo
| years_active    = 1993–2010
| mma_kowin       = 10
| mma_subwin      = 8
| mma_decwin      = 7
| mma_dqwin       = 1
| mma_koloss      = 7
| mma_subloss     = 14
| mma_decloss     = 12
| mma_draw        = 2
| mma_nc          = 0
| url             =
| sherdog         = 296
| footnotes       =
| updated         =
}}

Vernon Verdell White (born December 3, 1970) is an American retired professional mixed martial arts fighter who fought for the Ultimate Fighting Championship (UFC), Pride Fighting Championships, Strikeforce, King of the Cage, Pancrase, the World Fighting Alliance, and the Nevada Lions of the IFL. He is the former King of the Cage Light Heavyweight Championship, and King of the Cage Light Heavyweight Superfight Championship.

MMA career
Coming from a Taekwondo background. White debuted at 22 years of age in the Pancrase organization in Japan after being recruited by Ken Shamrock. Thrown right into the fire from the beginning, a very inexperienced White would go 8-17-1 in Pancrase to start his career.

However, White would turn his career around in a big way towards the latter part of the decade. He turned in an impressive showing against MMA legend Kazushi Sakuraba at PRIDE 2, landing a hard punch in the opening seconds to stagger Sakuraba and fighting very competitively, showcasing excellent submission defense and escapes throughout the fight until he was finally caught in an armbar late in round 3.

From 1998 to 2002, White found great success in mixed martial arts competition, compiling a record of 9-1 and winning the King of the Cage Middleweight Championship. White defended the title four times before losing a decision to MMA pioneer Jeremy Horn. This was especially impressive because at the time, King of the Cage was an upper echelon MMA promotion. He evolved into one of the more talented and well known mixed martial arts fighters in the world and developed excellent striking to go along with a solid submission wrestling base.

White also had impressive showings in the UFC, fighting to a draw with Ian Freeman in a fight that he took on short notice, and also turning in a competitive, hard fought loss to former UFC Light Heavyweight Champion Chuck Liddell at UFC 49 in 2004.

Professional wrestling career
White appeared on the April 7, 1997 airing of the World Wrestling Federation program Raw Is War, losing a worked 'shoot fight' to his Lion’s Den mentor Ken Shamrock.

Personal life
Vernon and his wife Melissa Kline were married on April 30, 2007. The couple had their first child, a son, on May 31, 2008.

 Kickboxing record 

|-  style="background:#cfc;"
| 2008-05-31 || Win ||align=left| Anthony Brown || XFA 2 || Las Vegas, Nevada, USA || Decision (unanimous) || 3 || 3:00 
|-  style="background:#fbb;"
| 2003-08-15 || Loss ||align=left| Remy Bonjasky || K-1 World Grand Prix 2003 in Las Vegas II || Las Vegas, Nevada, USA, Quarter Finals || KO (flying high kick) || 1 || 1:55
|-
| colspan=9 | Legend'':

Championships and accomplishments 
King of the Cage
King of the Cage Light Heavyweight Championship (One time)
Four successful title defenses
King of the Cage Light Heavyweight Superfight Championship (One time, first, only)
One successful title defense
World Vale Tudo Championship
WVC 2 Tournament Runner Up

Mixed martial arts record 

|-
| Loss
| align=center| 26–33–2
| Jason MacDonald
| Submission (triangle choke)
| W1 Bad Blood
| 
| align=center| 3
| align=center| 2:12
| Montreal, Quebec, Canada
| 
|-
| Loss
| align=center| 26–32–2
| Lew Polley
| Decision (unanimous)
| WarGods 5
| 
| align=center| 3
| align=center| 5:00
| Alpine, California, United States
| 
|-
| Win
| align=center| 26–31–2
| Jeremiah Constant
| DQ
| XCC 6: Western Threat
| 
| align=center| 1
| align=center| N/A
| Reno, Nevada, United States
| 
|-
| Loss
| align=center| 25–31–2
| Marcelo Tigre
| TKO (injury)
| X-1: Grand Prix 2007
| 
| align=center| 1
| align=center| 3:26
| Honolulu, Hawaii, United States
| 
|-
| Loss
| align=center| 25–30–2
| Mike Whitehead
| TKO (punches)
| IFL: Las Vegas
| 
| align=center| 2
| align=center| 0:54
| Las Vegas, Nevada, United States
| 
|-
| Win
| align=center| 25–29–2
| Sam Hoger
| Submission (rear naked choke)
| IFL: Moline
| 
| align=center| 2
| align=center| 3:25
| Moline, Illinois, United States
| 
|-
| Loss
| align=center| 24–29–2
| Bobby Southworth
| Decision (unanimous)
| Strikeforce: Triple Threat
| 
| align=center| 5
| align=center| 5:00
| San Jose, California, United States
|For vacant Strikeforce Light Heavyweight Championship.
|-
| Loss
| align=center| 24–28–2
| Victor Valimaki
| Decision (unanimous)
| EF 2: The Ultimate Decision
| 
| align=center| 3
| align=center| 5:00
| Vancouver, British Columbia, Canada
| 
|-
| Loss
| align=center| 24–27–2
| Lyoto Machida
| Decision (unanimous)
| WFA: King of the Streets
| 
| align=center| 3
| align=center| 5:00
| Los Angeles, California, United States
| 
|-
| Win
| align=center| 24–26–2
| Jason Guida
| TKO (doctor stoppage)
| WEC 18
| 
| align=center| 1
| align=center| 5:00
| Lemoore, California, United States
| 
|-
| Win
| align=center| 23–26–2
| Alex Stiebling
| KO (punch)
| WEC 17
| 
| align=center| 2
| align=center| 0:09
| Lemoore, California, United States
| 
|-
| Loss
| align=center| 22–26–2
| Matt Horwich
| Submission (rear-naked choke)
| SF 12: Breakout
| 
| align=center| 2
| align=center| 2:38
| Portland, Oregon, United States
| 
|-
| Win
| align=center| 22–25–2
| Justin Burgin
| Decision (unanimous)
| Valor Fighting: Medford Mayhem
| 
| align=center| 3
| align=center| 5:00
| Medford, Oregon, United States
| 
|-
| Win
| align=center| 21–25–2
| Chris Peak
| TKO
| Valor Fighting: Home of the Brave
| 
| align=center| 1
| align=center| N/A
| Susanville, California, United States
| 
|-
| Loss
| align=center| 20–25–2
| Chuck Liddell
| KO (punch)
| UFC 49
| 
| align=center| 1
| align=center| 4:05
| Las Vegas, Nevada, United States
| 
|-
| Loss
| align=center| 20–24–2
| Marvin Eastman
| Decision (unanimous)
| KOTC 32: Bringing Heat
| 
| align=center| 3
| align=center| 5:00
| Miami, Florida, United States
| 
|-
| Draw
| align=center| 20–23–2
| Ian Freeman
| Draw
| UFC 43
| 
| align=center| 3
| align=center| 5:00
| Las Vegas, Nevada, United States
| 
|-
| Loss
| align=center| 20–23–1
| Jeremy Horn
| Decision (unanimous)
| KOTC 23: Sin City
| 
| align=center| 5
| align=center| 5:00
| Las Vegas, Nevada, United States
| Lost King of the Cage Light Heavyweight Championship.
|-
| Win
| align=center| 20–22–1
| Mike Rogers
| Decision (split)
| KOTC 16: Double Cross
| 
| align=center| 3
| align=center| 5:00
| San Jacinto, California, United States
| Defended King of the Cage Light Heavyweight Championship.
|-
| Win
| align=center| 19–22–1
| James Lee
| Submission (heel hook)
| KOTC 11: Domination
| 
| align=center| 3
| align=center| 1:00
| San Jacinto, California, United States
| Defended King of the Cage Light Heavyweight Championship
|-
| Win
| align=center| 18–22–1
| Joe Priole
| TKO (punches)
| WMMAA 1: MegaFights
| 
| align=center| 2
| align=center| N/A
| Atlantic City, New Jersey, United States
| 
|-
| Win
| align=center| 17–22–1
| Marvin Eastman
| Decision (split)
| KOTC 8: Bombs Away
| 
| align=center| 3
| align=center| 5:00
| Williams, California, United States
| Defended King of the Cage Light Heavyweight Championship.
|-
| Win
| align=center| 16–22–1
| David Dodd
| KO (flying knee)
| KOTC 6: Road Warriors
| 
| align=center| 2
| align=center| 3:43
| Mt. Pleasant, Michigan, United States
| Defended King of the Cage Light Heavyweight Championship.
|-
| Win
| align=center| 15–22–1
| Marcos da Silva
| Submission
| IFC: Battleground 2
| 
| align=center| 1
| align=center| N/A
| Atlantic City, New Jersey, United States
| 
|-
| Loss
| align=center| 14–22–1
| Allan Goes
| Decision (unanimous)
| PRIDE 9
| 
| align=center| 2
| align=center| 10:00
| Nagoya, Japan
| 
|-
| Win
| align=center| 14–21–1
| Todd Medina
| KO (punch)
| KOTC 3: Knockout Nightmare
| 
| align=center| 1
| align=center| 0:09
| San Jacinto, California, United States
| Won King of the Cage Light Heavyweight Championship.
|-
| Win
| align=center| 13–21–1
| Vladimir Matyushenko
| Decision (split)
| IFC: Montreal Cage Combat
| 
| align=center| 1
| align=center| 25:00
| Montreal, Quebec, Canada
| 
|-
| Win
| align=center| 12–21–1
| David Terrell
| Decision (unanimous)
| IFC WC 4: Warriors Challenge 4
| 
| align=center| 3
| align=center| 5:00
| Jackson, California, United States
| 
|-
| Loss
| align=center| 11–21–1
| Kazushi Sakuraba
| Submission (armbar)
| PRIDE 2
| 
| align=center| 3
| align=center| 6:53
| Yokohama, Japan
| 
|-
| Win
| align=center| 11–20–1
| Brian Gassaway
| Submission (ankle lock)
| WPC: World Pankration Championships 1
| 
| align=center| 1
| align=center| 1:26
| Texas, United States
| 
|-
| Loss
| align=center| 10–20–1
| Vladimir Matyushenko
| Submission (neck crank)
| IFC 5: Battle in the Bayou
| 
| align=center| 1
| align=center| 5:44
| Baton Rouge, Louisiana, United States
| 
|-
| Loss
| align=center| 10–19–1
| Mario Sperry
| Decision (unanimous)
| Caged Combat 1: Australian Ultimate Fighting
| 
| align=center| 3
| align=center| 5:00
| Sydney, Australia
| 
|-
| Loss
| align=center| 10–18–1
| Pedro Rizzo
| KO (kick)
| WVC 2: World Vale Tudo Championship 2
| 
| align=center| 1
| align=center| 6:30
| Brazil
| 
|-
| Win
| align=center| 10–17–1
| Iouri Oulianitski
| KO (kick)
| WVC 2: World Vale Tudo Championship 2
| 
| align=center| 1
| align=center| 1:21
| Brazil
| 
|-
| Win
| align=center| 9–17–1
| Cees Bezems
| Submission (heel hook)
| WVC 2: World Vale Tudo Championship 2
| 
| align=center| 1
| align=center| 2:10
| Brazil
| 
|-
| Loss
| align=center| 8–17–1
| Osami Shibuya
| Decision (lost points)
| Pancrase: Truth 7
| 
| align=center| 1
| align=center| 20:00
| Nagoya, Japan
| 
|-
| Win
| align=center| 8–16–1
| Kazuo Takahashi
| KO (head kick)
| Pancrase: 1996 Anniversary Show
| 
| align=center| 1
| align=center| 19:43
| Urayasu, Japan
| 
|-
| Win
| align=center| 7–16–1
| Minoru Suzuki
| Decision (majority)
| Pancrase: 1996 Neo-Blood Tournament, Round 2
| 
| align=center| 1
| align=center| 15:00
| Tokyo, Japan
| 
|-
| Loss
| align=center| 6–16–1
| Masakatsu Funaki
| Submission (ankle lock)
| Pancrase: Truth 6
| 
| align=center| 1
| align=center| 2:34
| Fukuoka, Japan
| 
|-
| Draw
| align=center| 6–15–1
| Takaku Fuke
| Draw (unanimous)
| Pancrase: Truth 5
| 
| align=center| 1
| align=center| 10:00
| Tokyo, Japan
| 
|-
| Loss
| align=center| 6–15
| Ryushi Yanagisawa
| Submission (ankle lock)
| Pancrase: Truth 3
| 
| align=center| 1
| align=center| 12:47
| Tokyo, Japan
| 
|-
| Win
| align=center| 6–14
| Kazuo Takahashi
| Decision (lost points)
| Pancrase: Truth 3
| 
| align=center| 1
| align=center| 10:00
| Tokyo, Japan
| 
|-
| Loss
| align=center| 5–14
| Frank Shamrock
| Submission (achilles hold)
| Pancrase: Eyes Of Beast 7
| 
| align=center| 1
| align=center| 5:23
| Hokkaido, Japan
| 
|-
| Loss
| align=center| 5–13
| Katsuomi Inagaki
| Decision (majority)
| Pancrase: Eyes Of Beast 6
| 
| align=center| 1
| align=center| 10:00
| Yokohama, Japan
| 
|-
| Loss
| align=center| 5–12
| Gregory Smit
| Decision (1–0)
| Pancrase: 1995 Neo-Blood Tournament Opening Round
| 
| align=center| 1
| align=center| 10:00
| Tokyo, Japan
| 
|-
| Loss
| align=center| 5–11
| Manabu Yamada
| Submission (heel hook)
| Pancrase: Eyes Of Beast 5
| 
| align=center| 1
| align=center| 10:26
| Sapporo, Japan
| 
|-
| Win
| align=center| 5–10
| Larry Papadopoulos
| Submission (heel hook)
| Pancrase: Eyes Of Beast 3
| 
| align=center| 1
| align=center| 9:54
| Nagoya, Japan
| 
|-
| Loss
| align=center| 4–10
| Takafumi Ito
| Submission (armbar)
| Pancrase: Eyes Of Beast 2
| 
| align=center| 1
| align=center| 7:26
| Yokohama, Japan
| 
|-
| Loss
| align=center| 4–9
| Masakatsu Funaki
| Submission (armlock)
| Pancrase: King of Pancrase Tournament Opening Round
| 
| align=center| 1
| align=center| 5:37
| Tokyo, Japan
| 
|-
| Win
| align=center| 4–8
| Leon van Dijk
| Submission (heel hook)
| Pancrase: King of Pancrase Tournament Opening Round
| 
| align=center| 1
| align=center| 3:45
| Tokyo, Japan
| 
|-
| Loss
| align=center| 3–8
| Todd Bjornethun
| Decision (lost points)
| Pancrase: Road To The Championship 5
| 
| align=center| 1
| align=center| 15:00
| Tokyo, Japan
| 
|-
| Win
| align=center| 3–7
| Richard Saar
| KO (palm strikes)
| Pancrase: Road To The Championship 4
| 
| align=center| 1
| align=center| 3:25
| Osaka, Japan
| 
|-
| Win
| align=center| 2–7
| Katsuomi Inagaki
| Submission (heel hook)
| Pancrase: Road To The Championship 3
| 
| align=center| 1
| align=center| 4:15
| Tokyo, Japan
| 
|-
| Loss
| align=center| 1–7
| Remco Pardoel
| TKO (lost points)
| Pancrase: Road To The Championship 2
| 
| align=center| 1
| align=center| 14:24
| Amagasaki, Japan
| 
|-
| Loss
| align=center| 1–6
| Bas Rutten
| Submission (guillotine choke)
| Pancrase: Pancrash! 3
| 
| align=center| 1
| align=center| 1:16
| Osaka, Japan
| 
|-
| Loss
| align=center| 1–5
| Masakatsu Funaki
| KO (palm strike)
| Pancrase: Pancrash! 2
| 
| align=center| 1
| align=center| 1:13
| Nagoya, Japan
| 
|-
| Loss
| align=center| 1–4
| Andre Van Den Oetelaar
| Submission (rear-naked choke)
| Pancrase: Pancrash! 1
| 
| align=center| 1
| align=center| 6:22
| Yokohama, Japan
| 
|-
| Loss
| align=center| 1–3
| Ryushi Yanagisawa
| TKO (lost points)
| Pancrase: Yes, We are Hybrid Wrestlers 4
| 
| align=center| 1
| align=center| 8:55
| Hakata, Japan
| 
|-
| Win
| align=center| 1–2
| Katsuomi Inagaki
| TKO (doctor stoppage)
| Pancrase: Yes, We are Hybrid Wrestlers 3
| 
| align=center| 1
| align=center| 22:04
| Kobe, Japan
| 
|-
| Loss
| align=center| 0–2
| Minoru Suzuki
| Submission (leg scissor choke)
| Pancrase: Yes, We are Hybrid Wrestlers 2
| 
| align=center| 1
| align=center| 2:36
| Nagoya, Japan
| 
|-
| Loss
| align=center| 0–1
| Takaku Fuke
| Submission (armbar)
| Pancrase: Yes, We are Hybrid Wrestlers 1
| 
| align=center| 1
| align=center| 1:19
| Urayasu, Japan
|

Notes and references

External links
 Official Website
 
 Vernon White IFL Page
 

1971 births
Living people
American male mixed martial artists
Mixed martial artists utilizing taekwondo
Mixed martial artists utilizing wrestling
American male professional wrestlers
American male kickboxers
Sportspeople from Sparks, Nevada
Ultimate Fighting Championship male fighters